The One Who Really Loves You is the second album recorded by R&B singer and Motown recording artist Mary Wells, released in 1962 on the Motown label. The album featured the hits, "The One Who Really Loves You" and "You Beat Me to the Punch" and other singles such as the ballads "Strange Love" and "Two Wrongs Don't Make a Right".

Track listing

Side one
"The One Who Really Loves You" (William "Smokey" Robinson)
"Two Wrongs Don't Make a Right" (Berry Gordy, Jr., William "Smokey" Robinson)
"You Beat Me to the Punch" (Ronald White, William "Smokey" Robinson) 
"I've Got a Notion" (Brian Holland, George Fowler, Robert Bateman)
"The Day Will Come" (Brian Holland, Robert Bateman)

Side two
"Strange Love" (Mickey Stevenson, George Gordy)
"You're My Desire" (Rex Robertson, William "Smokey" Robinson)
"I'll Still Be Around" (Janie Bradford, Richard Wylie)
"She Don't Love You" (William "Smokey" Robinson)
"Drifting Love" (Mary Wells)

Personnel
Mary Wells - lead vocals
The Love Tones - backing vocals (on "The One Who Really Loves You", "You Beat Me to the Punch", "Strange Love" and "You're My Desire")
The Andantes - backing vocals (on "The Day Will Come", "Strange Love" and "She Don't Love You")
Robert Bateman - backing vocals (on "She Don't Love You")
The Funk Brothers - instrumentation

1962 albums
Mary Wells albums
Albums produced by Berry Gordy
Albums produced by Smokey Robinson
Albums produced by William "Mickey" Stevenson
Motown albums
Albums recorded at Hitsville U.S.A.